Karel Engliš (17 August 1880 – 15 June 1961) was a Czech economist, political scientist and founder of teleological economic theory.

Engliš was the first rector of Masaryk University in Brno from 1919 to 1920, and from 1947 to 1948 was rector of Charles University in Prague. Together with Alois Rašín, he was significantly involved in the Czechoslovakian currency reform after World War I as Minister of Finance. From 1934 to 1938 he was governor of the National Bank of Czechoslovakia.

Life 
Born in Hrabyně into a butcher family, his studies were marked by poverty. He graduated from the Czech grammar school in Opava and after graduation he continued his studies at the Faculty of Law of Charles-Ferdinand University in Prague, which he graduated in 1904. One of his teachers was economist Albín Bráf, who recognized his extraordinary talent and recommended him to work at the Provincial Statistical Office, from where in 1908 he transferred to the Ministry of Trade in Vienna. In 1910 he habilitated to associate professor of economics at the Czech technology in Brno, in 1911 he became an extraordinary and in 1917 a full professor. In 1913–1914 he was the Dean of the Department of Cultural Engineering and in 1917–1918 the Dean of the Department of Chemical Engineering.

In 1913–1918 he was a member of the Moravian Land Assembly for the progressive party of Adolf Stránský, in 1918–1925 he was a member of the National Democratic Party and in 1920–1925 he was a member of the National Assembly, as well as chairman of the Moravian-Silesian Party. Executive Committee of the National Democratic Party. In 1915 he wrote contributions to Masaryk's Our Time. On 2 September 1925 he resigned, and resigned from the National Democratic Party. Then in 1925 he participated in the establishment of the National Labor Party, which he refused to join.

Together with Alois Rašín, he played a significant role in the monetary reform of post-war Czechoslovakia, but he was a strong opponent of his deflationary policy. He served as Minister of Finance in six governments, in 1920–1931, and then in 1934–1939 as Governor of the National Bank of Czechoslovakia. As Minister of Finance and Governor of the National Bank, he worked conceptually. He was able to assess the situation very well and propose the right economic measures. He was responsible, among other things, for stabilizing the currency, streamlining the state budget, building a modern tax system, overcoming the post-war economic upheaval and mitigating the effects of the Great Depression in the 1930s. He also had the main credit for the merger of the Anglo-Czechoslovak Bank with the Prague Credit Bank in 1929. The aim was to create a strong financial institution that could compete with the strongest bank in Czechoslovakia, the Živnostenská Banka. The merger was completed in early 1930, but did not fulfill Engliš’s expectations due to the economic crisis.

In 1919, he became a professor and the first rector of the newly founded Masaryk University in Brno, in the establishment of which he participated together with František Weyr and Alois Jirásek. He was a professor of the national economy of the local law faculty and in 1921–1922 and 1925–1926 also its dean. He founded his own teleological school of economics, dealing with the assessment of the purposefulness of the behavior of all economic entities. His merits in the field of national economy were awarded for membership in the Czech Academy of Sciences and Arts, became an extraordinary member on 19 March 1927, a full member on 9 April 1946. Since its inception in 1929, he was also a member of the Czechoslovak statistical companies. It is little known that after the Munich Agreement (1 October 1938) he succeeded in initiating the transport of the remains of Karel Hynek Mácha from Litoměřice, which was to fall to Germany, to Prague.

From 1947 to 1948 he was the rector of Charles University. After the coup d'état in February 1948, he abdicated all his university positions and forcibly withdrew from public life. In August 1952, he had to move out of Prague on the basis of administrative persecution, but he managed to obtain the consent of the authorities so that he could return to his native Hrabyně. In the last years of his life, he was the target of a number of restrictive measures in his personal life, his work was heavily criticized by communist propaganda, and his writings were banned and expelled from public libraries. He faced the persistent bullying of the communist totalitarian power, which consisted mainly in constant house searches and also in the fact that his originally very high pension was drastically reduced several times to the absolute minimum. Even in these difficult conditions, he was able to devote himself to his scientific work. He focused mainly on logic, the national economy, the controversies of the two previous disciplines and the writing of memories. Most of it remained only in manuscripts, and even after 1989 only a few titles from that period were published. He died after years of hardship in very modest conditions with only the support of family and close friends.

Family life 
On 5 June 1906 he married Maria Grögrová (1880–1953), the daughter of a tax inspector from Uherský Brod, in Prague. On 21 April 1907 their daughter Vlasta (1907–2001) was born, married to the Brno architect František Plhoně, later daughter Věra (1908–1990) and son Karel (1912–1991). At the time of the wedding and the birth of the children, Karel Engliš was the draftsman of the provincial statistical office. The marriage was divorced from the table and bed in 1919 and separated in 1921. Karel Engliš married for the second time on 12 June 1921 in Brno (civil marriage) to Valeria Sovová (1884–1964).

Thinking 
In addition to public activity, his theoretical work was also extremely important. He gradually became the most important theorist of interwar Czechoslovakia. Unlike other economic theorists, he had the opportunity to verify his scientific conclusions in practice and then possibly revise them. As a teacher, he influenced two generations of Czech economists and was the founder of the so-called Brno School of Economics.

He began his scientific work before the First World War in the field of social policy. His work at the university led him to the need for theoretical mastery of all economics and the development of the concept of economic cognition. It was based on the theory of marginal utility against the then prevailing causal interpretation of economic issues. He was inspired by the method of economic cognition, the so-called teleological theory, from the Vienna School of Economics, of which he was (similarly to Rašín under the influence of A. Bráf) a follower. According to Karel Engliš, economics is a science of order, where individuals and entire nations try to take care of maintaining and improving their lives. Order in the economy is based on purposeful thinking. The peak of his theoretical activity isSystem of national economy. In this extensive two-volume work (he has a total of about 1,700 pages) he summarized his economic teachings.

In his theoretical work, he was influenced mainly by neo-Kantianism and was inspired by the normative theory of Hans Kelsen. He analyzed the teleological way of cognition and thinking, because man's action is always held for a purpose. In any economic system, all subjects always try to achieve an improvement in their existence, so also in the economy he rejected simple causality. However, while in individualistic (capitalist) systems everyone decides on the satisfaction of their needs, in solidarity (socialist) it is the care of another, foreign entity, which can therefore no longer have such a good overview. In practice, however, there are always mixed systems. Engliš himself was not a supporter of a controlled economy, he saw its justification only in cases of temporary critical situations.

Although he worked closely with Rašín, in many respects he differed significantly from him. He criticized his deflationary policy, his persistent efforts to strengthen the Czech currency and his insistence on the gold standard. He had good reasons for this: already between 1921 and 1923, the price level fell by 43%, but exports fell by 53% and unemployment rose from 72 to 207 thousand people. Although the deflationary policy was revoked by the parliament in 1925, the leadership of the National Bank continued to insist on it, even though during the economic crisis the price of gold rose sharply, and with it the exchange rate of the koruna. Between 1930 and 1933, the price level decreased by 19%, but exports fell by 64% and unemployment rose from 105 to 736 thousand people. It was not until 1934 that Engliš was able to enforce the devaluation of the crown by 16%, which was not enough.

Engliš was originally a perfectionist who mastered complex verbal theoretical constructions. He is characterized by extensive controversies with opponents, where he exhaustively discusses all arguments and counter-arguments. As a lecturer, he enriched his speeches with deep practical excursions. In 1991, President Václav Havel awarded him the Order of Tomas Garrigu Masaryk III in memoriam. class for outstanding merits for democracy and human rights.

Legacy 
In 1990, the Karel Engliš Society was founded in Prague, and in 1994, the Karel Engliš Prize was established by Masaryk University in Brno, which was awarded annually to a prominent economist.

Every year, the Rector of Charles University awards the Prof. prof. JUDr. Karel Engliš as one of the types of Rector's Awards to the best graduates of social sciences ( PF, FF, FSV, FHS ).

The private Brno University of Karel Engliš or the streets in Prague 5 in Smíchov and Opava are named after Karel Engliš.

In 2022, the Czech National Bank is to issue a commemorative banknote with a portrait of Karel Engliš, preliminarily with a nominal value of CZK 100.

Work 
 Basics of economic thinking. Brno: Barvič & Novotný, 1922. 132 p.
 Selected chapters from the national economy. Prague: Státní nakladatelství, 1925. 200 p.
 Financial science: an outline of the theory of public bond economy. Prague: Fr. Borový, 1929. 407 p.
 Teleology as a form of scientific knowledge. Prague: F. Topič, 1930. 162 p.
 Economics and philosophy. Prague: Fr. Borový, 1931. 55 p.
 In need of excess. Prague: Fr. Borový, 1935. 104 p.
 System of national economy: [the science of order in which individuals and nations care for maintaining and improving life]. Volume I. Prague: Melantrich, 1938. 891 p.
 System of national economy: [the science of order in which individuals and nations care for maintaining and improving life]. Volume II. Prague: Melantrich, 1938. 724 p.
 National economy for the purposes of the highest levels of secondary schools. Prague: Orbis, 1940. 304 p.
 Economic systems. Prague: Všehrd, 1946. 147 p.
 Little logic: the science of the order of thought. Prague: Melantrich, 1947. 511 p.
 The eternal ideals of humanity. Prague: Vyšehrad, 1992. 161 pp. (This is a text from the estate of K. Engliš, completed on January 28, 1956.)
 Countess of my youth. Opava: Matice slezská, 1999. 108 pp. . 2nd edition Opava: Matice slezská, 2010. 107 pp. .

Notes 
In 1929, Pestrý týden presents a photograph of Karel Engliš with his second wife Valeria.

References

Literature
 Biographical dictionary of Silesia and northern Moravia . 1. workbook. Ostrava: University of Ostrava; Opava: Optys, 1993. 112 pp.  . pp. 31–33.
 DOLEŽALOVÁ, Antonie. Rašín, Engliš and the Others: Confrontation of Economic Policy and Practice of the First Czechoslovak Republic in the Fiscal and Monetary Areas. Years 1918-1928 . Prague: Josef Hlávka Institute of National Economy, 2002. 39 pp.  .
 ENGLIŠ, Karel. Countess of my youth . Opava: Matice slezská, 1999. 108 pp.  .
 JANČÍK, Drahomír. "Putting the happiness of your future in the hands of Your Excellency ..." About the relationship of the pupil Karel Engliš to the teacher Albín Bráf. In: AMBROŽOVÁ, Hana, et al. Historian in Moravia: Professor Jiří Malíř, chairman of Matica moravská and head of the Institute of History, Faculty of Arts, Masaryk University, dedicate his colleagues, friends and pupils to their sixties . Brno: Matice moravská, 2009.  . pp. 159-168.
 Koderová - Sojka - Havel, Theory of money . Prague: Wolters Kluwer 2011
 KOLAŘÍK, Jaroslav. Money and politics: Karel Engliš, a stabilization fighter . Prague: František Borový, 1937. 597 p.
 KOSATIK, Pavel . Czech Democrats: 50 most important personalities of public life . Prague: Mladá fronta, 2010. 280 pp.  .
 MALÍŘ, Jiří, et al. Biographical dictionary of deputies of the Moravian Land Assembly in the years 1861–1918 . Brno: Center for the Study of Democracy and Culture, 2012. 887 pp.  . pp. 167–170.
 ŠLECHTOVÁ, Alena; LEVORA, Josef. Members of the Czech Academy of Sciences and Arts 1890–1952 . 2nd ed. Prague: Academia, 2004. 443 pp.  .
 TOMEŠ, Josef, et al. Czech Biographical Dictionary XX. century. Part I A-J . Prague; Litomyšl: Paseka; Petr Meissner, 1999. 634 pp.  . pp. 292–293.
 VENCOVSKÝ, František. Engliš's monetary theory and politics . Prague: Institute of Economics of the Czech National Bank, 1994. 72 p.
 VENCOVSKÝ, František. Karel Engliš . Brno; Boskovice: Masaryk University Foundation; Moravian Museum; Albert, 1993. 164 pp.  .
 VOŠAHLÍKOVÁ, Pavla, et al. Biographical Dictionary of the Czech Lands: 15th volume: Dvořák – Enz . Prague: Libri, 2012. 467–610 pp.  . pp. 604–606.

External links 

  Wikibéral

1880 births
1961 deaths
People from Opava District
Finance ministers of Czechoslovakia
Academic staff of Masaryk University